Timothy W. Alexander (born April 10, 1965), also credited as "Herb" Alexander, is an American musician best known as the drummer for the rock band Primus. Alexander has played on the majority of Primus's discography, including some of the band's most well known albums such as Frizzle Fry (1990), Sailing the Seas of Cheese (1991), Pork Soda (1993) and Tales from the Punchbowl (1995). Alexander has been in the band across three stints; he initially left the band in 1996 and rejoined in 2003 before leaving again in 2010 and re-joining in 2013.

Outside of Primus, Alexander has played in several projects with Tool frontman Maynard James Keenan including the bands Puscifer and A Perfect Circle, and also played in the theatrical performance art group Blue Man Group. Alexander has been hailed for his "polyrhythmic" playing.

Biography 
Before Primus, Alexander played and recorded with Major Lingo, which at the time was a ska-based rhythm band that featured a lap steel guitar as the lead instrument, played by Tony Bruno.

Alexander got the job with Primus replacing Jay Lane (along with Larry LaLonde who replaced Todd Huth) in 1988, and lasted until 1996. Alexander's second stint with Primus was from early 2003 until approximately 2009 when he was replaced by Jay Lane. Les Claypool spoke of Alexander's playing in an interview with Bass Player: "[He] is a very precise player. Even when we're really stretching on something, you can rarely tell that we're still a band that doesn't rehearse much. And a huge part of that is because of Tim".

Following Alexander's departure from Primus, he went on to form his own group, Laundry, which released on Claypool's label Prawn Song Records. Alexander has also collaborated with experimental bass player Michael Manring and guitarist Alex Skolnick to form the group known as Attention Deficit.

Alexander was the first drummer of A Perfect Circle, performing early live shows with the band, and recording drums for the track "The Hollow" on the band's debut album, Mer de Noms.

Alexander joined the theatrical group Blue Man Group, and has occasionally played with the Las Vegas-based improvisational rock band Überschall.

Despite being primarily known for his drum work Alexander is also a guitarist and singer. He performed live guitar with the group Born Naked and held the lead vocal duties on Laundry's second album and supporting tour.

Alexander was involved throughout 2008–2009 in a project known as Into the Presence which features songs by Luis Carlos Maldonado. Their debut album was released on Razor and Tie Records and includes performances from bassist Paz Lenchantin and cellist Ana Lenchantin. Both into The Presence and the Fata Morgana release were recorded and produced at Alexander's own Ghost Town Studios.

As of 2010 Alexander is actively involved as a member of Maynard James Keenan's Puscifer project. He has toured with them and can be heard on their most recent released recordings.

On September 25, 2013, Rolling Stone announced via an interview with Claypool that Alexander would be rejoining Primus, with a possible recording session taking place as early as November. Previous drummer Jay Lane would be moving on to other projects including his former band Ratdog.

On July 18, 2014, Alexander suffered a heart attack, and underwent open heart surgery.  Primus updated Alexander's health status on July 21 with a Facebook post stating, "The Mighty Tim "Herb" Alexander has pulled through surgery, the blockage from his heart has been removed with no complications and all signs point to a glorious and speedy recovery."  He rejoined Primus for their "Primus and the Chocolate Factory" tour 3 months later on October 22, 2014.

Alexander's drumming influences include Neil Peart, John Bonham, Stewart Copeland, and Bill Bruford.

Alexander operated a cider company out of Bellingham, Wa, called Herb's Cider. It ceased trading in late 2021.

Primus 
 Suck on This (1989)
 Frizzle Fry  (1990)
 Sailing the Seas of Cheese (1991)
 Miscellaneous Debris (1992)
 Pork Soda (1993)
 Tales from the Punchbowl (1995)
 Animals Should Not Try to Act Like People (2003)
 Primus & the Chocolate Factory with the Fungi Ensemble (2014)
 The Desaturating Seven (2017)

Laundry 
 Blacktongue (1994)
 Motivator (1999)

A Perfect Circle 
 Mer de Noms (2000) (Drums on "The Hollow")

Attention Deficit 
 Attention Deficit (1998)
 The Idiot King (2001)

Michael Manring 

 Thonk (1994) (Drums on "Big Fungus", "Disturbed", and "Bad Hair Day")

Fata Morgana 
 This Is A Dream (2005)

Puscifer 
 "V" Is for Vagina (2007)
 "C" Is for (Please Insert Sophomoric Genitalia Reference Here) (2009)
 Conditions of My Parole (2011)
 Money Shot (2015)

Into the Presence 
 Into the Presence (2009)

Net of Indra 

 Net of Indra (2018) (Drums, gongs, bells and bowls)

Various 
 Flyin' Traps (1997)
Drum Nation Vol. 1 (2004)

References

External links 
TA on MySpace

1965 births
Living people
People from Cherry Point, North Carolina
Musicians from North Carolina
Primus (band) members
A Perfect Circle members
American heavy metal drummers
20th-century American drummers
American male drummers
21st-century American drummers